Tower of Terror is a 1997 American supernatural horror television film written and directed by D. J. MacHale and starring Steve Guttenberg and Kirsten Dunst. It is based on the theme-park attraction, The Twilight Zone Tower of Terror, at the Walt Disney World Resort in Bay Lake, Florida, and aired on ABC on October 26, 1997, as a presentation of The Wonderful World of Disney. It is Disney's first film based on one of its theme-park attractions and the only one produced for television.

The film, which has no connection to any incarnation of The Twilight Zone, was partly filmed at the actual attraction in Orlando, while the rest was filmed on a stage in Hollywood, Los Angeles. As of 2023, the film is not available on any streaming service or aired on any television channels for unknown reasons.

Plot
Journalist Buzzy Crocker writes for a supermarket tabloid, The National Inquisitor, after his termination from the Los Angeles Banner (where his then-girlfriend Jill works as editor) for publishing a fake news story. Helping him in his job is young niece Anna, with whom he is close friends. Sometime later, an elderly woman named Abigail Gregory comes to visit Buzzy, and explains that on Halloween in 1939, she was witness to a bizarre incident in the Hollywood Tower Hotel, when five hotel guests – singer Carolyn Crosson, Crosson's boyfriend: actor Gilbert London, much-loved child star Sally Shine, her nanny Emeline Partridge, and bellhop Dewey Todd, – mysteriously disappeared without a trace when lightning struck the elevator they were in on their way up to a party at the hotel's Tip Top Club.

Abigail states that the nanny, Emeline, was a bitter witch who tried to put a curse on Sally, only for the curse to misfire, trapping all of the five people who were in the elevator as ghosts, who haunt the hotel. Buzzy investigates the shuttered hotel and finds a book of spells mentioned in Abigail's story, also discovering the curse can be reversed by its "contrary". Abigail also explains that items belonging to the passengers must be found, and what happened in 1939 must be repeated to break the curse. Buzzy and Anna enlist the help of Chris "Q" Todd, the hotel caretaker and grandson of Dewey Todd. Q is reluctant, but he decides to help his deceased grandfather and the four guests, especially as he stands to inherit the hotel if an explanation to the 1939 event is revealed.

Inside the hotel, Buzzy and Anna meet an actress named "Claire Poulet", who had been hired so Buzzy could take fake pictures of the "ghosts" for the supermarket tabloid. Buzzy tries to develop a relationship with Claire, but she is dismayed when Buzzy expresses more interest in restoring his career than helping the spirits. Fearing an intrusion, some of the ghosts appear and repeatedly attempt to frighten off Buzzy and Anna, but Anna steadfastly offers to help the ghosts escape the curse. Finally, the ghost of Carolyn appears. Apparent immediately, she is the same "Claire Poulet" to whom Buzzy already talked. Anna accuses Emeline of cursing the other guests, but a shocked Emeline states her innocence, to which the other ghosts agree.

Researching Buzzy's story, Jill discovers that Abigail is the sister of Sally Shine. Abigail was secretly jealous of her younger sister's talents and fame. Although Halloween was Abigail's birthday, no one seemed to have remembered. After finding out that Abigail caused the curse, she also discovers that Abigail has been in a sanitarium ever since, but is allowed out on day release.

Buzzy realizes that finding the personal effects of the guests (a lock of Sally's hair, Ms. Partridge's handkerchief, Dewey's spare bell-boy hat, Gilbert's Oxford spectacles, and Carolyn's locket) and repairing the elevator have given Abigail the means to complete the curse. He and Jill rush back to the hotel, but they are too late. Unaware that they are about to walk into a trap, Carolyn, Gilbert, Dewey, Emeline, and Sally enter the repaired elevator. Anna runs in, but only Sally makes it out of the elevator before the doors close and the car moves up the shaft. The group confronts Abigail, who then tearfully admits her actions before Sally appears.

The elevator continues to move up, but gets stuck on the 11th floor again, with only minutes left before the final phase of the curse takes effect. Sally explains that the party was a surprise birthday party for Abigail and apologizes to Abigail for not being able to get to it, but of course, Abigail did not know about it. Sally has kept the present she wanted to give to Abby - a golden friendship bracelet with two hearts engraved with their names - assuming she would forgive her. Buzzy then explains that Abigail was the one who started the curse all out of jealousy over Sally, which makes Sally surprised that Abigail is an old woman now and was the one responsible. Abigail is distraught at her mistake, but does not know how to stop the spell. Buzzy, Q, Jill, Abby, and Sally board the service elevator, catching up with the others on the 11th floor. Anna manages to leap from an emergency escape hatch, rejoining Buzzy and the others, but at exactly 8:05 pm, lightning strikes the hotel again, and both cars plummet towards the basement. Amid the chaos, Sally and Abby reconcile, breaking the curse. As they hold hands, they both dissolve into a shower of golden sparkles that safely stops both elevators just before they crash.

Buzzy and his group follow up behind as Carolyn, Gilbert, Dewey, Emeline, and Sally finally ascend to the party at the Tip-Top Club, restored to its former glory; Gilbert proposes to Carolyn after the latter performs for the party. One by one, the ghosts then ascend to Heaven, along with the other partygoers. Abigail, now a child again, appears with Sally, and thanks her for the present. The sisters then hold hands and vanish into golden sparkles, reversing the curse on the hotel. With the spell broken, the Hollywood Tower Hotel is restored and reopened to the public, with Q taking charge as the new owner.

Cast

Steve Guttenberg – Buzzy Crocker
Kirsten Dunst – Anna Petterson
Nia Peeples – Jill Perry
Michael McShane – Chris "Q" Todd
Amzie Strickland – Abigail "Abby" Gregory
Melora Hardin – Carolyn Crosson / Claire Poulet
Alastair Duncan – Gilbert London
Lindsay Ridgeway – Sally "Sally Shine" Gregory
John Franklin – Dewey Todd
Wendy Worthington – Emeline Partridge
Lela Ivey – Patricia Petterson
Richard Minchenberg – Dr. Daniels
Marcus Smythe – Surgeon
Don Perry – Great Grand Dad
Michael Waltman – Reporter
Ben Kronen – Mr. Galvao
Bill Elliot – Bandleader
Shira Roth – Young Abigail
Lynne Donahoe – Chloe
Dean Marsico – Photographer

See also
List of ghost films

Notes

References

External links

  

 

1997 films
1997 horror films
1997 thriller films
1990s American films
1990s English-language films
1990s ghost films
1990s horror thriller films
1990s supernatural horror films
1990s supernatural thriller films
ABC network original films
American ghost films
American horror television films
American horror thriller films
American thriller television films
American supernatural horror films
American supernatural thriller films
Cultural depictions of Shirley Temple
Films about curses
Films about Hollywood, Los Angeles
Films about journalists
Films about witchcraft
Films based on amusement park attractions
Films scored by Louis Febre
Films set in 1939
Films set in 1997
Films set in elevators
Films set in hotels
Films shot in Los Angeles
Films shot in Florida
Walt Disney anthology television series episodes